Zhifu District is an urban district of the prefecture-level city of Yantai in Shandong Province, China.

Name
Although this name was used for the city by foreigners prior to the Communist victory in the Chinese Civil War, the locals referred to the settlement as Yantai (q.v.) throughout.

History
The area was inhabited as early as the Neolithic period by the Dongyi people. It was part of Qi County during the Qin dynasty. 
Formerly a small unwalled fishing village, Zhifu grew when its harbor was chosen to act as the international port for the larger city of Tengchow (now Penglai) nearby. It now forms part of the urban core of Yantai.

Administrative divisions
As 2012, this district is divided to 12 subdistricts.
Subdistricts

Education

Chefoo School previously educated foreign children.

References

Citations

Bibliography

 .
 

Yantai